John Kwadwo Gyampong (born 22 December 1950) is a Ghanaian politician and executive director. He served as a member of the 2nd parliament and was taken over by Rashid Bawa. He came back and served as an MP of the 4th parliament of the 4th republic of Ghana for the Akan Constituency in the Volta Region. He represented the National Democratic Congress.

Early life and education 
Gyampong was born on 22 December 1950.He attended the  Kejebi Secondary School and obtained his GCE Ordinary Level and the Kpando Secondary School and obtained his GCE Advanced Level. He obtained a Bachelor of Science in Education at the University of Cape Coast.

Career 
Kwadjo Gyampong is an executive director apart from being a politician, who represented the Akan Constituency in the first, second and fourth Parliament in the Volta Region of Ghana. He was also the Volta Regional Chairman of the National Democratic Congress (NDC) and currently the Oti Regional Chairman. He is a Teacher and also a Farmer.

Politics 
Gyampong is a member of the National Democratic Congress party. His political career as an MP begun in 1996 when he was voted into power to replace Seth Kwabena Akompi of the National Democratic Congress. He won the seat with 16,008 out of the 25,165 valid votes cast representing 73.40% over his opponents Fudu Kassim who polled 4,942 representing 14.80%, James Yaw Fato who polled 3,875 votes representing 11.605, seth Frank Alifui who polled 213 votes representing 0.60% and Joseph Yaw Biadoo who polled 127 votes representing 0.40%. However, he was also taken over by Rashid Bawa an Independent in the 2000 Ghanaian general elections by obtaining 12,306 votes which represented 54.90% of the share. He won the Akan seat again during the Ghana's 2004 general election  with 13,716 votes out of the 24,917 valid votes cast, gaining 55.9% share out of 100%. He took the Seat from Bawa Rashid, a New Patriotic Party candidate. In 2008, Joseph Kwadwo Ofori instead of Gyampong represented the National Democratic Congress in the elections and won the Akan seat.

In 2019, he has been moved in the newly created Oti region where he obtained his vote.

In 2020, he said : “Peace is a major factor in any political organization, it is a factor in the development of any country we need everyone to be peaceful.

“Nobody should come and convince anyone to create confusion to disrupt the elections,”.

The Oti Regional Chairman stressed his desire for peace heading towards the 2020 general elections and urged Ghanaians to vote for peace.

References 

1950 births
University of Cape Coast alumni
National Democratic Congress (Ghana) politicians
Ghanaian MPs 2001–2005
Ghanaian MPs 2005–2009
Living people
Ghanaian Christians
People from Volta Region
Ghanaian MPs 1997–2001
21st-century Ghanaian politicians